The United States House of Representatives elections in California, 1926 was an election for California's delegation to the United States House of Representatives, which occurred as part of the general election of the House of Representatives on November 2, 1926. Republicans gained one seat in a special election held on August 31, 1926, after incumbent Democrat John E. Raker died.

Overview

Delegation Composition

Results
Final results from the Clerk of the House of Representatives:

District 1

District 2

District 3

District 4

District 5

District 6

District 7

District 8

District 9

District 10

District 11

See also
70th United States Congress
Political party strength in California
Political party strength in U.S. states
1926 United States House of Representatives elections

References
California Elections Page
Office of the Clerk of the House of Representatives

External links
California Legislative District Maps (1911-Present)
RAND California Election Returns: District Definitions

1926
California United States House of Representatives
1926 California elections